Jacob M. "Jack" Gold (28 June 1930 – 9 August 2015) was a British film and television director. He was part of the British realist tradition which followed the Free Cinema movement.

Career
Jacob M. Gold was born in London, the son of Charles and Minnie (née Elbery) Gold. 

He attended University College London. After leaving UCL, he began his career as a film editor on the BBC's Tonight programme. Gold became a freelance documentary filmmaker, making dramas as a platform for his social and political observations.

For television, his best known work is The Naked Civil Servant (1975), based on Quentin Crisp's 1968 book of the same name and starring John Hurt. He had previously directed the 1964 crime series Call the Gun Expert for the BBC.

Other television credits include The Visit (1959), the BBC Television Shakespeare productions of The Merchant of Venice (1980) and Macbeth (1983) - the latter starring Nicol Williamson - as well as the made-for-TV adaptation of Graham Greene's The Tenth Man (1988), starring Anthony Hopkins and Charlie Muffin (1979, USA: A Deadly Game). In 1998, he directed an award-winning-adaption of the 1981 children's book Goodnight Mister Tom by Michelle Magorian, featuring John Thaw in the lead. He also directed films such as The National Health (1973), Man Friday (1975), Aces High (1976), The Medusa Touch (1978), The Chain (1985) and Escape from Sobibor (1987).

Gold directed the final episode of ITV's television detective drama Inspector Morse. Other work includes the television drama series Kavanagh QC and The Brief.

Gold was an Honorary Associate of London Film School.

Personal life
Gold married actress Denyse Alexander (née Macpherson) in 1957, with whom he shared a birthday - she was born in 1932. The couple had three children: Jamie, Nicholas and Kathryn.

Filmography

References

Other sources
 Aitken, Ian (ed.). Encyclopedia of the Documentary Film. New York: Routledge, 2005. .

External links
 
 

British television directors
Alumni of University College London
British film directors
1930 births
2015 deaths
British Jews